St Margaret and the Dragon is a c.1559 painting by Titian of saint Margaret the Virgin; it is now in the Museo del Prado in Madrid.

In 2018 a version of it was sold at a Sotheby's auction for $2,175,000.

References

Paintings by Titian in the Museo del Prado
1559 paintings
Religious paintings
Paintings of dragons